The Shanti Bhavan Children's Project (in Hindi: "haven of peace") is a U.S. 501(c)(3) and India 80-G non-profit organisation based in Bangalore Karnataka, India, that operates a pre-K-12 residential school in Baliganapalli, Tamil Nadu. The school annually enrolls 12 boys and 12 girls (at four years old) for its incoming pre-school class. Thereafter, students stay at the school year-round except for summer and winter breaks. Students attend Shanti Bhavan free of charge and are provided with nutritional meals, clothes, shelter, education, healthcare and emotional and mental support. Shanti Bhavan is accredited by the Council for the Indian School Certificate Examinations (CISCE), and administers the ICSE and ISC exams during students' 10th and 12th grades. After students' 12th grade, Shanti Bhavan also pays for their college education.

At present, the school accommodates approximately 300 students who come from rural villages or urban slums. A majority (95%) of the students are Dalits - formerly known as untouchables. Due to caste-based discrimination, the students come from extremely impoverished backgrounds.

Students are educated in subjects such as mathematics, history, geography, Hindi, English writing/reading, physics, chemistry, business, accounting, biology, etc. Older students attend workshops in writing, public speaking, and debate.

History
The school was founded by Dr Abraham George, an Indian-American businessman and philanthropist. After serving in the Indian Army, Dr. George attended NYU's Stern School of Business and began his own company, Multinational Computer Models Inc. In 1995, he began the non-profit organisation The George Foundation. Shanti Bhavan was established in August 1997 as a project of The George Foundation to help economically and socially disadvantaged children, mostly Dalit, in rural India - specifically in the Tamil Nadu, Andhra Pradesh, and Karnataka regions.

In 2008, as a result of the global financial crisis, Shanti Bhavan underwent a financial crisis of its own. With the help of current Director of Operations, Ajit George, Shanti Bhavan Children’s Project moved from a privately funded institution to a mixed model of individual donations, corporate and NGO partnerships, and grants. On September 10, 2008, Shanti Bhavan separated from The George Foundation and became a non-profit organisation run under the Shanti Bhavan Educational Trust.

Method
The school takes in children as young as four years old whose families are below poverty level. Shanti Bhavan financially supports them throughout their years at the school as well as through college, providing 17 years of support education.

Shanti Bhavan follows the CISCE curriculum; students take their ISCE examinations in their 10th and 12th grades to determine their college placement.

Media
Shanti Bhavan featured in the documentary The Backward Class (2014), and the Netflix documentary series Daughters of Destiny: The Journey of Shanti Bhavan (2017), written, directed, and co-produced by Vanessa Roth.

In 2014, Shanti Bhavan student Visali was honoured as one of Glamour’s Women of the Year. In 2016, Shanti Bhavan student Keerthi was profiled in Glamour’s The Girl Project.

Partners and programs
The organisation has a volunteer program which employs volunteer educators from some educational and non-profit organisations such as ASTEP (Artists Striving to End Poverty), and She's the First to teach academic and non-academic subjects.

References

Other references

External links
 

Non-profit organisations based in India
1997 establishments in Karnataka
Organizations established in 1997